GET Arena is a kart racing venue in Lekki, Lagos opposite Oriental Hotel. It has been closed down permanently. The venue also incorporates eateries among other facilities as an event center to host social gatherings.

References

External links
 (CNN)

Kart circuits
Sports venues in Lagos
Entertainment venues in Lagos
Motorsport venues in Nigeria
Defunct organizations based in Lagos
Defunct motorsport venues